The 2019 Peruvian promotion play-offs or Cuadrangular de Ascenso 2019 will be held in December 2019 with all games being played at a neutral ground yet to be determined. The play-offs determined the third and fourth team to be promoted to the Liga 1 following that tournament's expansion. The teams placed 2nd and 3rd in the 2019 Liga 2 and 2019 Copa Perú will take part in the promotion play-offs. The top two placed team in the play-offs will gain promotion to the 2020 Liga 1 and the bottom two will qualify to the  2020 Liga 2.

Background
The Peruvian Football Federation took control of the local domestic league from the Professional Football Sports Association, the tournament organizers, in 2019 and announced that the Peruvian first division tournament would be re-branded for 2019. With this re-branding, the tournament was expand from 16 to 18 teams and then to 20 in 2020.
At the beginning of the 2019 season, it was announced that the teams that finished 2nd and 3rd in the bottom two tiers of the Peruvian football league system would compete on the promotion play-offs at the end of the year to decide which two teams would receive the expansion slots. 

At the beginning of the 2019 season, the Peruvian Football Federation decided against the decision of further expanding the first division tournament to 20 teams. The teams from the second division refused to begin the 2019 Liga 2 tournament until they received confirmation from the Federation that the expansion agreement reached in 2018 would be respected. As such the Federation accepted the terms and decided to once again organize a promotion play-off similar to the one used in 2018.

Road to the play-offs

Segunda División

Liguilla Quarterfinals

Liguilla Semifinals

Copa Perú

Final group stage

Promotion play-offs

See also
 2019 Liga 1 (Peru)
 2019 Liga 2 (Peru)
 2019 Copa Perú

References

External links
  
Liga 2 news at Peru.com 
Liga 2 statistics and news at Dechalaca.com 
 RSSSF

2019 in Peruvian football